The 2007 Carnegie Challenge Cup began in February 2007. The Challenge Cup is the most prestigious knock-out competition in the world of rugby league, featuring teams from across Europe including England, Scotland, Wales, France and Russia.

In 2007 the preliminary round was dropped, reducing the number of amateur clubs involved. Teams from the National League were given byes to round three, and teams from the Super League entered in round four. Teams from outside the UK were introduced at various stages.

St. Helens successfully defended their title after beating Catalans Dragons (who were the first French club ever to take part in the competition's final) 30 – 8 in the final at the new Wembley Stadium on 26 August.

Round 1
(week ending 4 February)

Teams came from the National Conference League, Rugby League Conference, Student Rugby League, Pennine League, North West Counties, Yorkshire League, CARLA, Hull & District League and the Armed Forces. This round consisted entirely of amateur teams. Fife Lions, the only Scottish club in the tournament, were eliminated.

Round 2
(week ending 25 February)

Russian team Kazan Arrows entered the competition. Castleford Lock Lane defeated Bradford Dudley Hill after extra time in the closest game of this round, which against consisted of amateur teams.

Round 3
(week ending 11 March)

Teams from National League Two, National League One entered at this stage, as did three teams from France and Lokomotiv Moscow from Russia.

Lokomotiv's defeat ended the competition for Russian teams.  The Castleford derby was a highlight of the draw, though the professional Castleford Tigers defeated their amateur neighbours. 2005 semi-finalists Toulouse failed to win at York, though Pia's victory against Blackpool ensured that one team from the French Rugby League Championship progressed. All remaining amateur teams were eliminated.

Round 4
(week ending 1 April)

This round saw the teams from the  Super League enter.  The only all-Super League match saw Warrington defeat Hull KR.  Celtic Crusaders' defeat saw the final Welsh team leave the tournament.  Once again, however, all games went to form, with no sides from lower leagues defeating a team from a higher league. Pia's defeat saw the French rugby league championship's exit from the Cup.

Round 5
(week ending 13 May)

No new teams enter at this stage with all matches scheduled to be played over 12 and 13 May.  The remaining teams for the 5th round are made up with eleven teams from Super League, three from National League One and two from National League Two.

Quarter-finals

Semi-finals

Final

UK Broadcasting rights
The tournament was screened in the United Kingdom by the BBC.

External links
Rugby Football League

Challenge Cup
St Helens R.F.C.
Challenge Cup
Challenge Cup
2007 in English rugby league
2007 in French rugby league
2007 in Scottish sport
2007 in Russian sport